Guni (also Romanized as Gūnī) is a village in Qezel Gechilu Rural District, in the Central District of Mahneshan County, Zanjan Province, Iran. At the 2006 census, its population was 234, in 62 families.

References 

Populated places in Mahneshan County